Kristal Rubí Soto Cruz (born 14 October 1995), known as Rubí Soto, is a Mexican professional footballer who plays as a forward for C.D. Guadalajara (women).

Early life
Soto attended the Universidad del Valle del Fuerte where she played for the football team.

Club career

2018–2020: Guadalajara
Soto signed for Guadalajara in December 2017 for the Closura tournament of the inaugural season of the Liga MX Femenil.  She scored her first goal for the team during a 2–0 win over Querétaro on February 25, 2018. During a match against Tigres UANL, she scored two goals (a brace). During a match against C.F. Monterrey, she scored an equalizer.

2020–present: Villarreal
On 23 June 2020, Soto was signed by Villarreal CF to play in the Spanish Segunda División Pro. She became the first homegrown player from the Liga MX Femenil to receive an offer to play in Europe, without having been previously called up by Mexico at any level.

Career statistics

Club

Notes

References

External links
 
 Rubí Soto at C.D. Guadalajara Femenil 

1995 births
Living people
Mexican women's footballers
Women's association football forwards
Footballers from Sinaloa
People from Ahome Municipality
Liga MX Femenil players
C.D. Guadalajara (women) footballers
Villarreal CF (women) players
Mexican expatriate women's footballers
Mexican expatriate sportspeople in Spain
Expatriate women's footballers in Spain
Mexican footballers